1978 saw the launch of the Pioneer Venus missions launched by the United States, on 20 May and 8 August. The Pioneer Venus Multiprobe landed four spacecraft on the planet, one of which transmitted data for 67 minutes before being destroyed by atmospheric pressure. ISEE-C, which was launched on 8 December, flew past comet 21P/Giacobini–Zinner in 1985, and Halley's Comet in 1986.

Launches

|}

Deep Space Rendezvous

EVAs

References

Footnotes

 
Spaceflight by year